The Dallas Stars are a professional ice hockey team based in Dallas. They compete in the National Hockey League (NHL) as a member of the Central Division in the Western Conference, and were founded during the 1967 NHL expansion as the Minnesota North Stars, based in Bloomington, Minnesota. Before the 1978–79 NHL season, the team merged with the Cleveland Barons after the league granted them permission due to each team's respective financial struggles. Ultimately, the franchise relocated to Dallas for the 1993–94 NHL season. The Stars played out of Reunion Arena from their relocation until 2001, when the team moved less than  into the American Airlines Center.

The Stars have won eight division titles in Dallas, two Presidents' Trophies as the top regular-season team in the league, the Western Conference championship three times, and the Stanley Cup in 1998–99. Joe Nieuwendyk won the Conn Smythe Trophy as the most valuable player of the playoffs that year.

In 2000, Neal Broten was inducted into the United States Hockey Hall of Fame. In 2009, Brett Hull became the first Dallas Stars player inducted into the Hockey Hall of Fame, followed by Ed Belfour and Joe Nieuwendyk in 2011 and Mike Modano in 2014; Modano is the highest-scoring player in franchise history. In 2010, brothers Derian and Kevin Hatcher were inducted to the United States Hockey Hall of Fame. The franchise has appeared in the Stanley Cup finals five times (1981, 1991, 1999, 2000, and 2020) and has won one championship (1999).

Franchise history

Minnesota North Stars (1967–1993)

The Minnesota North Stars began play in 1967 as part of the league's six-team expansion. Home games were played at the newly constructed Metropolitan Sports Center ("Met Center") in Bloomington, Minnesota. Initially successful both on the ice and at the gate, the North Stars fell victim to financial problems after several poor seasons in the mid-1970s.

In 1978, the North Stars merged with the Cleveland Barons (formerly the California Golden Seals), owned by George III and Gordon Gund. With both teams on the verge of folding, the league permitted the two failing franchises to merge. The merged team continued as the Minnesota North Stars, while the Seals/Barons franchise records were retired. However, the Gunds were the merged team's principal owners, and the North Stars assumed the Barons' place in the Adams Division in order to balance out the divisions. The merger brought with it a number of talented players, and the North Stars were revived—they reached the Stanley Cup Finals in 1981, where they lost in five games to the New York Islanders. However, by the early 1990s, declining attendance and the inability to secure a new downtown revenue-generating arena led ownership to request permission to move the team to the San Francisco Bay Area in 1990. The league rejected the request and instead agreed to award an expansion franchise, the San Jose Sharks, to the Gund brothers. The North Stars were sold to a group of investors that were originally looking to place a team in San Jose, although one of the group's members, former Calgary Flames part-owner Norman Green, would eventually gain control of the team. In the following season, the North Stars made it to the Stanley Cup Finals, only to lose to the Pittsburgh Penguins.

After the 1990–91 season, the North Stars suffered through declining profits coupled with distraction and uncertainty caused by relocation attempts. The team's fortunes were further impeded by the terms of the settlement with the Gund brothers, in which they were permitted to take a number of North Stars players to San Jose. In their final two seasons in Minnesota, the team adopted a new logo which omitted any reference to the word "North" from "North Stars", leading many fans to anticipate the team heading south. Green explored the possibility of moving the team to Anaheim to play at a new arena (which is now the Honda Center) under construction, and intended to call the team the Los Angeles Stars. However, in 1992 the league decided to award an expansion franchise to The Walt Disney Company to play in Anaheim's new arena.

Relocation and early years in Dallas (1993–1998)

In 1993, amid further attendance woes and bitter personal controversy, Green obtained permission from the league to move the team to Dallas, for the 1993–94 season, with the decision announced on March 10, 1993. Green was convinced by former Dallas Cowboys quarterback Roger Staubach that Dallas would be a suitable market for an NHL team. With the team's move to the Southern United States, Green decided to drop the "North" adjective but otherwise retained the "Stars" nickname, which in its shortened form quickly proved popular as it matched Texas' official nickname as "The Lone Star State." The Stars would move into Reunion Arena, built in 1980, the downtown arena already occupied by the National Basketball Association's Dallas Mavericks.

To quell the ensuing controversy, the NHL promised that the Twin Cities would receive an expansion franchise in the future; that promise was fulfilled in 2000 in the form of the Minnesota Wild.

With the league changing the names of the conferences and divisions that season, the newly relocated Stars were placed in the Central Division of the Western Conference, and played their first game in Dallas on October 5, 1993, a 6–4 win against the Detroit Red Wings. In that game, Neal Broten scored the first Stars goal in Dallas. Dallas was an experiment for the league. At that time, the Stars would be one of the three southernmost teams in the league, along with the newly created Tampa Bay Lightning and Florida Panthers, as the league's first real ventures into southern non-traditional hockey markets. Though the Stars were relatively still unknown in the area, word of the team spread rapidly, and the immediate success of the team on the ice, as well as Mike Modano's career-best season (50 goals, 93 points) helped spur the team's popularity in Dallas. The Stars set franchise bests in wins (42) and points (97) in their first season in Texas, qualifying for the 1994 playoffs. The Stars further shocked the hockey world by sweeping the St. Louis Blues in the first round, but lost to the eventual Western Conference Champion Vancouver Canucks in the second round. The Stars' success in their first season, along with Modano's spectacular on-ice performances, would be an integral part of the Stars' eventual franchise success in the immediate years to come.

The almost immediate success of the Stars was also helped by the long legacy of minor-league hockey in the area. Both incarnations of the Central Hockey League had two teams in the area, the Fort Worth Texans and the Dallas Black Hawks for years before the Stars' arrival. These two teams were bitter rivals, and some of the traditions and famous rivalry incidents, including what is thought to be the first known use anywhere at an athletic event of "Rock and Roll Part 2" by Fort Worth and the famous "10 Cent Beer Night" near-riot in 1978 helped create awareness of hockey. Amateur and youth hockey were also extremely popular because of the long presence of the minor league teams.

Green, who had run into financial problems stemming from his business ventures outside of hockey, was forced to sell the team to businessman Tom Hicks in December 1995.

Tom Hicks era and building for a championship
The 1994–95 season was shortened by an owners' lockout. The Stars traded captain Mark Tinordi along with Rick Mrozik to the Washington Capitals before the season began for Kevin Hatcher. Longtime North Stars hold-over Neal Broten was named his replacement, although he was traded too after only 17 games to the New Jersey Devils. Broten was replaced by Kevin's younger brother Derian Hatcher as team captain, a role he would serve in for the next decade. The Stars played only 48 games that season posting a record of 17–23–8. Despite the shortened season and the losing record, the Stars again made the playoffs, losing in five games to the Red Wings in the first round.
 
The 1995–96 season would be the first full season under new owner Tom Hicks. In the off-season, the Stars traded for former Montreal Canadiens' captain and three-time Frank J. Selke Trophy winner Guy Carbonneau, who was then with the St. Louis Blues. With the Stars struggling to begin the season, general manager and head coach Bob Gainey traded for center Joe Nieuwendyk from the Calgary Flames in exchange for Corey Millen and Jarome Iginla, then a Stars prospect. The Stars recorded only 11 wins in the first half of the season, and Bob Gainey relinquished his coaching duties in January to be the full-time general manager of the team. The Stars soon hired Michigan K-Wings head coach Ken Hitchcock to replace him; it would be his first NHL head coaching position. The Stars then traded for Benoit Hogue from the Toronto Maple Leafs late in the season, but ultimately finished in sixth place in the Central Division, missing the playoffs for the first time since moving to Texas.

In the 1996 off-season, the Stars continued to revamp their roster, adding defensemen Darryl Sydor from the Los Angeles Kings followed by Sergei Zubov from the Pittsburgh Penguins for Kevin Hatcher. Zubov would serve as the Stars' top defenseman and powerplay quarterback until leaving the league in 2009. On the ice, Ken Hitchcock's first season proved to be a good one. The Stars bested their 1994 totals, posting 48 wins and reaching the 100-point mark for the first time in franchise history. The Stars won the Central Division, their first division title since 1983–84 (when they were still the Minnesota North Stars) and were seeded second in the playoffs. Despite the regular-season success, the youthful Stars were upset in the first round by the Edmonton Oilers in seven games. Defenseman Grant Ledyard tripped in overtime of Game 7, allowing Todd Marchant to score the game- and series-winning goal on a breakaway against goaltender Andy Moog.

During the 1997 off-season, the Stars signed star goaltender Ed Belfour as a free agent after a well-publicized falling-out with the San Jose Sharks, which had traded a number of players to the Chicago Blackhawks to obtain him in January in the previous season. Andy Moog was allowed to leave via free agency, but later returned to the Stars as an assistant coach. The 1997–98 season was another banner year for the Stars. The Stars again set franchise records in wins (49) and points (109). Dallas acquired Mike Keane at the deadline from the New York Rangers. The Stars won the franchise's first Presidents' Trophy as the league's best regular-season team, as well as the Central Division title for the second season in a row. Belfour set franchise season records for goals against average (1.88), wins (37) and just missed out on the Jennings Trophy by one goal to Martin Brodeur of the New Jersey Devils. The Stars were the first overall seed for the 1998 Stanley Cup playoffs and defeated the eighth-seeded San Jose Sharks in six games in the first round. Notorious enforcer Bryan Marchment injured Joe Nieuwendyk's right knee, forcing him to miss the rest of the playoffs with torn ligaments. In the second round, they again met the Edmonton Oilers, this time defeating them in five games. However, without Nieuwendyk, the Stars lacked the firepower to overcome the defending Stanley Cup champion Detroit Red Wings in the Western Conference Finals and lost in six games. The Red Wings went on to win their second consecutive Stanley Cup.

Dominance, a Stanley Cup championship, and deep playoff runs (1998–2004)

In the 1998 off-season, after falling just short in the Western Conference Finals, the Stars added what they believed was the final piece toward winning a championship: star goalscoring winger Brett Hull. Hull had already had a successful career with the St. Louis Blues, with three consecutive 70-goal seasons and a Hart Memorial Trophy, but a fallout with Blues management led Hull to leave St. Louis via free agency. Additionally, this was the first season for the Stars in the Pacific Division after the 1998 NHL division re-alignment.

In the 1998–99 season, the Stars won 51 games, surpassing the 50-win mark for the first time in franchise history. They also recorded 114 points, which still stands today as a franchise record. They won the Pacific Division by 24 points, their third consecutive division title; a second consecutive Presidents' Trophy; the Jennings Trophy as the league's top defensive team; and were awarded home-ice advantage throughout the 1999 playoffs. Winger Jere Lehtinen was also awarded the Frank J. Selke Trophy.

In the first round of the playoffs, Dallas faced the Edmonton Oilers. The Stars swept the Oilers in four close games, winning Game 4 in the third overtime on a goal by Joe Nieuwendyk. They then faced the St. Louis Blues in the second round. After taking a 2–0 series lead, the Blues came back to tie the series. The Stars then won the next two games to beat the Blues in six games. The series again ended on an overtime goal, this time from Mike Modano. In the Conference Finals, they faced the Colorado Avalanche for the first time in Stars history. This would be the first of four playoff meetings between the Stars and Avalanche in the next seven years. After both the Stars and the Avalanche split the first four games at a 2–2 series tie, the Avalanche won Game 5 by a score of 7–5, taking a 3–2 series lead, The Stars rallied winning game six on the road, and Game 7 at home, both by 4–1 scorelines.

This was the Stars' first Stanley Cup Finals appearance as the Dallas Stars, although they made the finals twice as the Minnesota North Stars. They faced the Eastern Conference champion Buffalo Sabres, who had defeated the Toronto Maple Leafs 4–1 in the Eastern Conference Finals. After splitting the first four games, the Stars vaunted defense would hold the Sabres to only one goal in the next two, winning Game 5 2–0 and Game 6 2–1 on an overtime goal by Brett Hull. Hull's goal at 14:51 of the third overtime was allowed to stand only after a lengthy official review. That season, the league still had the "crease rule" in effect, which provided that if any player of the attacking team who did not have possession of the puck entered the crease before the puck, then any resulting goal was disallowed. Hull had initially gained possession of the puck outside the crease and had made a shot that was blocked by Buffalo goaltender Dominik Hasek. One of Hull's skates entered the crease as he corralled the rebound, and Hull's second shot scored the Cup-winning goal. The goal was eventually allowed, as having simply blocked Hull's shot rather than catching it, Hasek never took possession of the puck away from Hull. Officials therefore determined that rather than calling it a loose puck, Hull would be considered to have had continuous possession of the puck from before his first shot outside the crease. The complexity of the crease rule, and the attendant difficulties in understanding its application by fans and players alike, combined with the controversy arising out of the disputed Stanley Cup-winning goal, resulted in the crease rule being repealed the following season. Hull's goal marked the 13th time a Stanley Cup-winning goal was scored in overtime, and only the fourth to be scored in multiple overtimes. This was the only time between 1995 and 2003 that a team other than the New Jersey Devils, Colorado Avalanche or Detroit Red Wings won the Stanley Cup.

On December 31, 1999, Brett Hull scored his 600 and 601st career goals in a 5–4 win over the Mighty Ducks of Anaheim. The Stars ultimately won the Pacific Division for the second year in a row, and were seeded second in the Western Conference. Dallas then defeated the Edmonton Oilers and San Jose Sharks in the first and second rounds, both 4–1 series victories. The Stars, for the second season in a row, defeated the Colorado Avalanche in the Western Conference Finals in seven games to reach their second consecutive Stanley Cup Finals, where they met the New Jersey Devils. Because the Devils finished the regular season with one more point than Dallas, the Stars had to play their first playoff series without home-ice advantage since 1995. The Stars lost all three games at the Reunion Arena in the Finals, and lost the series in Game 6 on a double-overtime goal by New Jersey forward Jason Arnott.

Unsuccessful playoff runs
Hoping to win back the Stanley Cup, the Stars again captured the Pacific Division, posting a solid 48–24–8–2 record in the 2000–01 season. In the playoffs, the Stars and the Edmonton Oilers met in the first round, battling back-and-forth through the first four games, with each game decided by one goal, including three going into overtime. Game 5 would also go to overtime, as the Stars took a 3–2 series lead on a goal by Kirk Muller. However, in Game 6 in Edmonton, the Stars did not need overtime, advancing to the second round with a 3–1 win. Facing the St. Louis Blues, the Stars would run out of gas, being swept in four straight games. The Game 2 loss would be the last NHL game played in Reunion Arena.

Moving into the brand new American Airlines Center for the 2001–02 season, the Stars had a slow start to the season, as goaltender Ed Belfour struggled through one of his worst seasons. Head coach Ken Hitchcock was eventually fired, being replaced by Rick Wilson. Despite the coaching change, the Stars continued to play poor hockey. With the prospect of missing the playoffs, the Stars traded 1999 Conn Smythe winner Joe Nieuwendyk and Jamie Langenbrunner to the New Jersey Devils in exchange for Randy McKay and Jason Arnott, who scored the game-winning goal in the 2000 Finals against Dallas. The Stars would eventually go on to post a respectable record of 35–28–13–5. However, it would not be enough for the playoffs, as they fell four points short of the final eighth spot in the Western Conference. Following the season, coach Rick Wilson would return to assistant coaching duties, as the Stars brought in Dave Tippett as his replacement.

As in the 2002 off-season, Ed Belfour left via free agency to the Toronto Maple Leafs. To begin the 2002–03 season, the Stars awarded the starting goaltending position to Marty Turco, who went on to have one of the best seasons in NHL history, posting the lowest goals-against average (GAA) since 1940, at 1.76. However, missing 18 games late in the season likely cost him a shot at the Vezina Trophy, awarded to the league's top regular-season goaltender. Regardless, the Stars posted the best record in the Western Conference at 46–17–15–4, and along the way, two-way star Jere Lehtinen won his third Frank J. Selke Trophy. In the playoffs, the Stars once again met the Edmonton Oilers, and once again the Oilers would prove a contentious opponent, winning two of the first three games. However, the Stars would prove the better team again by winning the next three games to take the series in six games. The Stars' second-round series against the Mighty Ducks of Anaheim got off to an unbelievable start, as the game went deep into overtime tied 3–3. However, Mighty Ducks goaltender Jean-Sebastien Giguere stopped 60 shots as the Ducks scored early in the fifth overtime. Game 2 would be more of the same, as the Ducks stunned the Stars in overtime. Desperately needing a win, the Stars bounced back to take Game 3 in Anaheim. However, the Ducks would take a 3–1 series lead by breaking a scoreless tie late in the third period of Game 4. In Game 5, the Stars finally solved Giguere by scoring four goals to keep their playoff hopes alive. However, the Stars' dreams of a return trip to the Stanley Cup Finals would end in heartbreaking fashion as the Ducks broke a 3–3 tie with 1:06 left in Game 6 on a goal by defenseman Sandis Ozolinsh.

Coming off their disappointing playoff loss, the Stars would get off to a shaky start to the 2003–04 season, as they played mediocre hockey through the first three months of the season, posting a sub-.500 record. However, as the calendar turned to 2004, the Stars began to find their game, as they posted a 9–4–3 record in January. As the season wore on, the Stars would get stronger, climbing up the playoff ladder and eventually reaching second place in the Pacific Division, where they finished with a solid 41–26–13–2 record; Marty Turco had another outstanding season, recording a 1.98 GAA. However, the Stars could not carry their momentum into the playoffs, as they were beaten by the Colorado Avalanche in five games in the first round.

Post-lockout era (2005–2008)
Coming out of the owners' lockout that cancelled the entire 2004–05 season, the Stars remained one of the strongest teams in the Western Conference for the start of 2005–06, as they won four of their first five games on the way to a solid October. November would be even better for Dallas, as they won 10 of 13 games and took over first place in the Pacific Division, a position they would hold most of the season, as they went on to finish with a terrific record of 53–23–6. One reason for the Stars' success was their strong play in shootouts, as forward Jussi Jokinen was nearly automatic, making 10-of-13 shot attempts. Also performing strongly in shootouts was Sergei Zubov, who used a slow-but-steady backhand to go 7-for-12, as the Stars ultimately won 12 of 13 games that were settled by a shootout. As the number two seed in the Western Conference, the Stars faced the seventh-seeded Colorado Avalanche. The Stars were favorited to win the Western Conference, and some even predicted them to win the Stanley Cup. However, the Stars would stumble right from the start, losing Game 1 by a score of 5–2 as the Avalanche scored five unanswered goals after the Stars jumped out to a promising 2–0 lead. Game 2 would see the Stars suffer another setback at home, as the Stars lost in overtime 5–4 on a goal by Joe Sakic. On the road in Game 3, the Stars led 3–2 in the final minute before the Avalanche forced overtime on a goal by Andrew Brunette, while Alex Tanguay won the game just 69 seconds into overtime to put the Stars in a 3–0 hole. The Stars would avoid the sweep with a 4–1 win in Game 4, but overtime would doom them again in Game 5, as Andrew Brunette scored the series winner at 6:05, ending the Stars' playoffs hopes after just five games.

Dallas hosts the All-Star Game (2006–07 season)
Following the previous season's disappointing first-round playoff loss at the hands of the seventh-seeded Avalanche, the Stars made a number of changes during the 2006 off-season. Former Stars goalkeeper Andy Moog was promoted to assistant general manager for player development (he kept his job as goaltending coach) and former player Ulf Dahlen was hired as an assistant coach. The Stars allowed center Jason Arnott, defenseman Willie Mitchell and goaltender Johan Hedberg to leave as free agents. Forward Niko Kapanen was traded to the Atlanta Thrashers and the remaining two years on fan-favorite right winger Bill Guerin's contract were bought out. The Stars also received Patrik Stefan and Jaroslav Modry in the Atlanta trade, and signed Eric Lindros, Jeff Halpern, Matthew Barnaby and Darryl Sydor as free agents. Young goaltender Mike Smith was promoted to the NHL to serve as Marty Turco's backup. During the season, key future pieces – center Mike Ribeiro and defenseman Mattias Norstrom – were added through separate trades. Young players Joel Lundqvist, Krys Barch, Nicklas Grossmann and Chris Conner all saw significant ice time while other players were out of the lineup with injuries.

On September 29, 2006, Brenden Morrow was announced as new team captain, taking the role over from Mike Modano, who had served as the incumbent since 2003. On March 13, 2007, Modano scored his 500th career NHL goal, making him only the 39th player and second American to ever reach the milestone. On March 17, Modano scored his 502nd and 503rd NHL goals, breaking the record for an American-born player, previously held by Joe Mullen.

On January 24, 2007, the NHL All-Star Game was held at the American Airlines Center. Defenseman Philippe Boucher and goaltender Marty Turco would represent the Stars as part of the Western Conference All-Star roster. The Stars qualified for the playoffs as the sixth seed in the Western Conference and squared off against the Vancouver Canucks in the first round. Marty Turco delivered three shutout wins in Games 2, 5 and 6, but the Stars' offense failed to capitalize and they lost the series in seven games, the third season in a row that they lost in the first round.

Return to playoff prominence (2007–08 season)
In the 2007 NHL Entry Draft, the Stars drafted the relatively unknown Jamie Benn 129th overall. After starting a lackluster 7–7–3 in the 2007–08 season, general manager Doug Armstrong was fired by the team. He was replaced by an unusual "co-general manager" arrangement of former assistant GM Les Jackson and former Stars player Brett Hull. On November 8, 2007, Mike Modano became the top American born point scorer of all-time, finishing off a shorthanded breakaway opportunity on San Jose Sharks goaltender Evgeni Nabokov.

On February 26, 2008, just hours before the trade deadline, the Stars traded for All-Star center Brad Richards from the Tampa Bay Lightning in exchange for backup goaltender Mike Smith and forwards Jussi Jokinen and Jeff Halpern. The Stars rallied to a final record of 45–30–7 and qualified for the playoffs as the fifth seed, matching up with the defending Stanley Cup champion, the Anaheim Ducks, in the first round. After a rough end to the season, only winning two games in March of that year, the Stars shocked everyone by winning the first two games of the series in Anaheim, and then would go on to finish off the Ducks in six games, their first playoff series win since 2003. In the second round, the Stars matched up with the Pacific Division champion San Jose Sharks. Once again, the Stars surprised everyone by winning the first two games of the series on the road. In Game 2, Brad Richards tied an NHL record by recording four points in the third period. The Stars would then take a 3–0 lead after a Mattias Norstrom overtime goal in Game 3. Captain Brenden Morrow finished the Sharks off in Game 6 with a powerplay goal nearly halfway into the fourth overtime. The win sent the Stars to their first Conference Finals since 2000, where they met the powerhouse Detroit Red Wings. After falling behind 3–0, the Stars made a series of it, however, winning two games before ultimately finally being ousted by the Red Wings in six games.

Transition seasons (2008–2011)

The 2008–09 season saw the early loss for the season of captain Brenden Morrow to an ACL tear. Off-season free agent acquisition Sean Avery caused a media uproar over comments he made to a Canadian reporter about ex-girlfriend Elisha Cuthbert and her relationship with Calgary Flames' defenseman Dion Phaneuf before a game in Calgary. The incident forced the team to suspend Avery for the season; he was later waived by the Stars. That incident, plus injuries to key players Brad Richards and Sergei Zubov, caused the Stars to tailspin to a 12th-place finish and the first missed playoffs for Dallas since 2002.

In the wake of the season, the Stars hired a new general manager, former player and alternate captain Joe Nieuwendyk. Hull and Jackson remained with the Stars, but were reassigned to new roles within the organization. Less than a week after he was hired, Nieuwendyk fired six-season head coach Dave Tippett on June 10, 2009, and hired Marc Crawford the next day as his replacement. Other off-season moves included the addition of Charlie Huddy as assistant coach in charge of defense and the promotions of Stu Barnes and Andy Moog to assistant coaches.

The Stars' 2009–10 season was similar to the previous one. Inconsistent play and defensive struggles plagued the team throughout the season, as they failed to adjust to Marc Crawford's new offensively-minded system, and owner Tom Hicks' financial troubles prevented the team from spending more than $45 million on payroll, over $11 million beneath the league salary cap. The Stars failed to win more than three games in a row all season, finished in last in the Pacific Division and repeated their 12th place conference finish from the year before with a record of 37–31–14 for 88 points. This was the first time that they would miss the playoffs two seasons in a row since the Stars moved to Texas. In the off-season, long-time goaltender Marty Turco was let go in favor of Kari Lehtonen to become the team's number one goaltender for the future. In the Star's last game of the season, away against the Minnesota Wild, Mike Modano was named the game's first star and skated around the rink after the game wearing his North Stars uniform, receiving a rousing ovation.

In the 2010 off-season, the Stars released Marty Turco and Mike Modano, the face of the franchise for the past two decades. Modano subsequently signed with the Detroit Red Wings while Turco joined the Chicago Blackhawks. Winger Jere Lehtinen, who played his entire career with the Stars, announced his retirement in December 2010. The team also made key acquisitions, such as winger Adam Burish (who was on the 2010 Stanley Cup champion Chicago Blackhawks) and goaltender Andrew Raycroft. They also gave Jonathan Cheechoo a try-out, but he was cut and later signed with division rivals San Jose Sharks.

To begin the 2010–11 season, the Stars won their first three games in a row, going on a three-game win streak for the first time since the 2008–09 season by beating the New Jersey Devils in overtime in the season opener, New York Islanders in a shootout and against Mike Modano and the Red Wings. In that same game in the home opener against the Red Wings, the Stars crowd gave Modano a standing ovation as he was shown on the American Airlines Center jumbotron during a timeout in the game.

After a hot start to the new season, the Stars would dominate the first half of the season, staying in both the Pacific Division lead and within the top three spots of the Western Conference. It seemed like the old Stars were back, as through the first half of the season they compiled a 30–15–6 record. However, after the All-Star Break the Stars went into a slump, going on numerous losing streaks which included one-goal losses and blowing late leads in numerous games. Through this though, the Stars still remained in the playoff picture. On the day of the trade deadline, the Stars traded up and comer James Neal and Matt Niskanen to the Pittsburgh Penguins in exchange for defenseman Alex Goligoski. After struggling much of the second half of the season the Stars still had a chance to make the playoffs by winning all their games in the month of April. They managed to win all of them except for their season finale as they lost on the road at the Minnesota Wild 5–3, costing them a playoff spot.

After missing the playoffs for the third consecutive season, Dallas fired coach Marc Crawford on April 12, 2011. In the spring of 2011, according to Darren Dreger of TSN, the team had been "financially managed" by the league for over a year. On June 16, 2011, Dallas hired Glen Gulutzan to be head coach, making him the sixth coach since the franchise's move from Minnesota. On September 13, 2011, lenders voted to agree to have the Stars file for bankruptcy and sold at auction. On September 21, 2011, Mike Modano announced his retirement from the league. By October 22, 2011, competing bids to buy the club were due. Vancouver businessman and Kamloops Blazers owner Tom Gaglardi's bid was the only one submitted, clearing the way for him to enter the final stages of taking over ownership of the team. Gaglardi's purchase was approved by the NHL Board of Governors on November 18, 2011.

A bankruptcy court judge approved the bid for an enterprise value of $240 million. First lien creditors got about 75 cents on the dollar. The Stars lost $38 million during their last fiscal year and $92 million over the last three seasons.

Tom Gaglardi era and Finals trip (2011–present)
As the new owner, Gaglardi's first move was bringing back former Stars President Jim Lites to once again take the reins as team president and CEO. To begin the 2011–12 season, the Stars once again jumped out to a fast start, going 22–15–1 through the first 38 games of the season. However, when the second half of the season began, the Stars slumped through the months of January and February, before getting hot again in late February. Throughout March, the Stars regained the lead of the Pacific Division. Beginning on March 26, 2012, the Stars embarked on a western road trip that saw them visit the Calgary Flames, Edmonton Oilers, Vancouver Canucks and San Jose Sharks. Going into the road trip, the Stars were in control of their own destiny, having to gain four points on the road trip to win their first Pacific Division title since the 2005–06 season. After the Stars lost 5–4 in Calgary to the Flames, the Stars beat the Oilers two nights later, 3–1. This would be their last win of the season, as the Stars were rolled over by the Canucks and Sharks. Even though they had lost the division crown, the Stars still had a chance to clinch a playoff spot. However, the Stars were eliminated from playoff contention on April 5 in a 2–0 loss to the playoff-bound Nashville Predators. The team failed to qualify for the playoffs for the fourth consecutive year, setting a franchise record for futility.

On July 1, 2012, the team signed free agent veterans Ray Whitney, Aaron Rome and Jaromir Jagr. The next day, the Stars traded fan-favorite Steve Ott and Adam Pardy to the Buffalo Sabres in exchange for center Derek Roy. When 2012–13 NHL lockout ended, the Stars began an up-and-down season, although staying in the race for one of the eight playoff spots in the shortened season, which had only 48 games. In mid-season, forward Michael Ryder was traded to his former team, the Montreal Canadiens, for Erik Cole. This shocked many Stars fans, as Ryder was a fan-favorite to Stars fans and had been producing good stats for the Stars throughout the shortened season. Before the trade deadline in early April, the Stars began to falter, and the team's captain, Brenden Morrow, was traded to the Pittsburgh Penguins; Roy was traded to the Vancouver Canucks; Jagr to the Boston Bruins; and Tomas Vincour to the Colorado Avalanche to close out the NHL trade deadline, all in exchange for draft picks and prospects. After all of the trades at the trade deadline, many counted the Stars out, as it seemed they were beginning to rebuild and throw in the towel during the season. However, the Stars' remaining young players pulled together to win six of their next eight games, thus propelling the Stars back into the 2013 playoff race. The Stars soon became the new Cinderella team and were getting better as their newfound success went on. However, the Stars dropped their final five games, losing all of them and gaining only one point in their final five games, which eliminated them from playoff contention. The Stars had now missed the playoffs for five straight seasons, continuing to set the all-time record in the franchise (dating back to the Minnesota days) for most consecutive seasons without a playoff appearance.

The day after their final regular-season game of the 2012–13 season (a 3–0 loss to the Detroit Red Wings), the Stars fired general manager Joe Nieuwendyk. The next day, the Stars introduced their 11th all-time general manager, Jim Nill, the former assistant general manager of the Red Wings. On May 14, 2013, the coaching staff was also fired, and on May 31, 2013, Scott White was re-introduced as the director of hockey operations. Nill made his first big trade as general manager when he acquired Tyler Seguin, Rich Peverley and Ryan Button from the Boston Bruins in exchange for Loui Eriksson, Reilly Smith, Matt Fraser and Joe Morrow.

During the 2013, the league underwent a major realignment. The Stars had long lobbied for this, as they were unhappy with the large number of games they had to play on the road in the Pacific Time Zone since 1998. Dallas' return to a revamped Central Division brought them a much more broadcast-friendly schedule for away games.

Under new head coach Lindy Ruff, the Stars made it to the 2014 playoffs with a successful run on a 40–31–11 record, finishing fourth in the Central Division the 2013–14 season. They lost in the first round of the playoffs to the Anaheim Ducks in six games with a 5-4 overtime loss in Game 6.

Nill made another big trade as general manager when he acquired Jason Spezza and Ludwig Karlsson from the Ottawa Senators in exchange for Alex Chiasson, Nick Paul, Alex Guptill and a second-round pick in the 2015 NHL Entry Draft. He also signed Senators player Ales Hemsky as a free agent on a three-year, $12 million contract on July 1, 2014. Despite these moves, the Stars finished with the second-lowest goaltender save percentage in the league during the 2014–15 season, which resulted in them failing to qualify for the 2015 playoffs due to their sixth-place finish in the Central Division. The lone bright spot of the 2014–15 season was Jamie Benn winning the Art Ross Trophy. On April 11, 2015, Benn scored four points in the Stars' last regular-season game to finish with 87 points on the season and win the Art Ross Trophy. His final point, a secondary assist with 8.5 seconds left in the game, allowed him to overtake John Tavares for the award.

In the 2015–16 season, the Stars won their first Central Division title since 1998 and posted the best regular-season record in the Western Conference. In the first round of the playoffs, they defeated the Minnesota Wild in six games. In the second round, they faced the St. Louis Blues, for the first time since 2001, and lost the series in seven games. The Stars finished with a 34–37–11 record in an injury-plagued 2016–17 season, missing the playoffs for the seventh time in the past nine seasons. As a result, the team announced that head coach Lindy Ruff's contract would not be renewed. Ken Hitchcock returned as head coach for the following season, and once again, the Stars missed the playoffs. Hitchcock retired after the season and was succeeded at the head coaching spot by Jim Montgomery. Montgomery's first season as the Stars coach saw the team make the playoffs, defeating the Nashville Predators in a six-game series the first round, but falling to the eventual Stanley Cup champion St. Louis Blues in seven games, losing game seven on the road in double-overtime by a score of 2–1 despite a 52-save performance by goaltender Ben Bishop.

In the 2019–20 season, the Stars defeated the Vegas Golden Knights in five games to advance to the Stanley Cup Finals for the first time since 2000. They went on to lose to the Tampa Bay Lightning in six games. In the next season, they missed the playoffs for the first time since 2018. The Stars finished the 2021-22 season in the first wild-card spot in the Western Conference, and played the Calgary Flames in the first round of the playoffs. They were defeated by the Flames in Game 7, losing 3–2 in overtime. After the team's playoff elimination, head coach Rick Bowness announced that he would be leaving the team.

Team information

Arena

When the Stars first moved from Minnesota, they played in Reunion Arena, which they shared with the National Basketball Association's Dallas Mavericks. For hockey, Reunion Arena held 17,001 for NHL games. Throughout the hockey history of Reunion Arena, the arena was known for having one of the worst ice surfaces in the league, especially in its final days hosting the Stars. The Stars played at Reunion for eight years, from 1993–2001. Before the 2001–02 NHL season, both the Stars and the Mavericks moved into the new American Airlines Center, which is in the Victory Park neighborhood of Dallas, just north of Reunion Arena. The American Airlines Center holds 18,584 for Stars and NHL games. On January 24, 2007, the AAC hosted the 2007 National Hockey League All-Star Game. The AAC and the Dallas Stars have won several local and NHL awards for the "Best Fan Experience".

Broadcast
All Dallas Stars games are broadcast on radio on KTCK under a five-year deal announced in January 2009. KTCK replaced WBAP, which had broadcast games since the beginning of the 1994 season after KLIF has broadcast the first season in Dallas in 1993. Television coverage occurs primarily on Bally Sports Southwest, with KTXA (Channel 21) or BSSW+ broadcasting games when BSSW has a conflict.

The Stars, along with the Buffalo Sabres and Carolina Hurricanes are one of only three NHL teams to simulcast the entirety of their games on TV and radio, which the team has done since their 1993 arrival in Dallas. The original broadcast team from 1993 to 1996 was Mike Fornes (play-by-play) and Ralph Strangis (color). Fornes left the broadcast team after the 1995–96 season; Strangis moved to the play-by-play role and color commentator Daryl "Razor" Reaugh was added. Although both the DFW area's large media market and the team's fan base could theoretically support separate television and radio broadcast teams, the Stars have continued simulcasting due to the popularity of "Ralph and Razor" (as they are known) among local listeners and viewers. Like other NHL teams, the Stars now have a live radio broadcast transmitted inside American Airlines Center on 97.5 FM. This is done because AM radio signals often cannot penetrate concrete and steel building exteriors.

Strangis retired from the booth after the 2014–15 season and was replaced by Dave Strader. In June 2016, Strader was diagnosed with cholangiocarcinoma, a fairly rare and aggressive form of cancer of the bile duct. To begin the 2016–17 season, Reaugh assumed play-by-play duties while Strader underwent treatment. Studio analyst and former Stars defenseman, Craig Ludwig, took over as color commentator. During a break in Strader's treatment, he returned to the broadcast booth on February 18, 2017, a 4–3 overtime home win against the Tampa Bay Lightning. After the game, the Stars saluted Strader at center ice. On October 1, 2017, Strader died of cancer at age 62, leaving Reaugh and Ludwig to call the 2017–18 season. In July 2018, the Stars announced that Reaugh would return to color commentary for the 2018–19 season, with former studio host Josh Bogorad taking over the play-by-play.

Logo and jersey design

When they debuted in Dallas for the 1993–94 season, they kept the same uniform design from their later Minnesota days, except for the addition of the Texas logo patch on the shoulders. Away uniforms were black and home uniforms were white. With minor trim changes, a darker shade of green, and the word 'Dallas' added in the 1994–95 season, they kept this design until their 1999 Stanley Cup-winning campaign. The black pants have the word "Dallas" in gold run through the sides with green stripes.

In the 1997–98 season, the Stars introduced an alternate uniform that partly resembled those worn during the NHL All-Star Game at the time. The uniform was mostly green on top and black at the bottom, in a star-shaped design. For the 1999–2000 season, it became the primary away uniform, and was paired with a new home uniform featuring the same basic design, with white on top and green at the bottom. They kept this design until the 2006–07 season, during which the league switched color designations on home and away jerseys in the 2003–04 season. The striping was also eliminated on the black pants.

The Stars introduced an alternate jersey for the 2003–04 season that proved both embarrassing and unpopular to critics and fans. The uniform, which was black with a green bottom and red trim, featured a modern representation of the constellation Taurus topped by a trailing green star with red trail marks. However, fans and critics derided the uniform crest for its resemblance to a uterus, nicknaming it the "Mooterus." The uniform was used until the 2005–06 season.

With the switch to the Reebok Edge uniform system, the jerseys underwent a complete redesign. The home black jersey, introduced for the 2007–08 season, features the player's number on the chest and an arched 'Dallas' in white with gold trim, with the primary logo on the shoulders. The primary away jerseys, which were used from 2007 to 2010 and was used as an alternate for its final season, had the Stars logo crest in front and the uniform number on the top right, with the Texas alternate logo on the shoulders. An alternate white jersey based on the home black jersey was introduced for the 2008–09 season; they became the regular away uniforms for the 2010–11 season. The lettering is in green with gold and black trim. Both uniforms were used until the 2012–13 season.

A new logo and uniforms were introduced for the 2013–14 season. Silver replaced gold as the tertiary color, while green (in a new shade called "Victory Green," similar to the old North Stars' shade of green) was reintroduced as a primary uniform color. The new logo features the letter D centering a star, symbolizing Dallas' nickname as "The Big D." The home uniforms are in green with black and white striping, while the away uniforms are in white with a green shoulder yoke, and black and green striping. The inner collar features the team name on the home uniforms, and the city name on the away uniforms. The secondary logo, with the primary inside a roundel with the team name, is featured in the shoulders.

The Stars unveiled a special edition uniform for the 2020 NHL Winter Classic, featuring a design inspired from the defunct USHL Dallas Texans hockey club. The uniform features the word "Stars" (with the star substituting for the letter A) in the middle of the big letter "D". Both are in white with silver trim. A silhouette of the state of Texas in silver and green trim with the letter "D" inside adorns the left sleeve.

For the 2020–21 season, the Stars added a black alternate uniform with neon green accents (presumably in honor of the Bank of America Plaza in downtown Dallas) featuring the alternate "Texas D" logo in front. A neon green star is added on the left side of the collar, symbolizing Texas' "Lone Star State" nickname. Numbers are in 3D-accented black with neon green accents. The Stars also released a "Reverse Retro" alternate uniform in collaboration with Adidas, bringing back the 1999–2007 uniform design but with the current color scheme in place of the original green, gold and black colors. The design also featured white pants. A second "Reverse Retro" alternate was released in the 2022–23 season, using the 1993–94 black uniform but with the current Victory Green and silver stripes.

Minor league affiliates

The Dallas Stars are presently affiliated with two minor league teams. The Texas Stars are the American Hockey League (AHL) affiliate of the Dallas Stars, who after becoming unaffiliated with the Iowa Stars in 2008, did not have an AHL affiliate for the 2008–09 season. The Texas Stars began play in the AHL in the 2009–10 season as an affiliate for Dallas. They are located in Cedar Park, Texas (northwest of Austin).

In addition to their AHL affiliate, the Dallas Stars are also affiliated with the Idaho Steelheads of the ECHL. Based in Boise, the Steelheads play home games at the Idaho Central Arena since 2003.

Traditions
Since the 2005–06 season, national anthems are performed by Celena Rae, a Fort Worth native and a former semi-finalist on American Idol. During "The Star-Spangled Banner", the fans yell the team name "stars" in the lines "whose broad stripes and bright stars" and "O say does that star spangled banner yet wave". At games, as part of the entertainment, a Kahlenberg KDT-123 fog horn sounds after every Stars goal.

When the Stars take the ice at the beginning of each game, the song "Puck Off" (also referred to as the "Dallas Stars Fight Song") by Pantera, is played in the arena. Members of the Dallas–Fort Worth–Arlington metropolitan area band had become friends with members of the Stars in the 1990s, especially following the team's Stanley Cup win in 1999. "Puck Off" later also became the team's goal celebration song. During the song, fans chant the only lyrics in the song, "Dallas! Stars! Dallas! Stars!" while pumping their fists in the air. After a penalty on the opposing team is announced, Stars public address announcer shouts, "Your Dallas Stars are on...the..." with the fans finishing "power play!", immediately after which a clip of the Muse song "Knights of Cydonia" is played. After each Stars win, the Stevie Ray Vaughan (a Dallas native) and Double Trouble song "The House is a Rockin'" is played. A song of unknown origin called "The Darkness Music" is played after nearly every away goal. In recent years, fans have usually yelled, "Who cares!?" after away team goals are announced by the public address announcer.

The Stars have hosted a home game on New Year's Eve every year since 1997, except in 2004, 2012, 2019, 2020 and 2021 (the first two being due to lockouts, the third being due to their participation in the 2020 NHL Winter Classic, the fourth being due to the delayed offseason caused by the COVID-19 pandemic, and the fifth was postponed to February 13 due to a team-wide COVID-19 outbreak). For a period of time, the game coincided with the Big D NYE celebration (now on hiatus) on the south side of the arena in AT&T Plaza.

Season-by-season record
This is a partial list of the last five seasons completed by the Stars. For the full season-by-season history, see List of Dallas Stars seasons.

Note: GP = Games played, W = Wins, L = Losses, OTL = Overtime losses, Pts = Points, GF = Goals for, GA = Goals against

Players

Current roster

Team captains
Note: This list does not include former captains of the Minnesota North Stars and Oakland Seals

Mark Tinordi, 1993–1995
Neal Broten, 1995 
Derian Hatcher, 1995–2003
Mike Modano, 2003–2006
Brenden Morrow, 2006–2013
Jamie Benn, 2013–present

League and team honors

Awards and trophies

Stanley Cup
1998–99

Presidents' Trophy
1997–98, 1998–99

Clarence S. Campbell Bowl
1998–99, 1999–2000, 2019–20

Art Ross Trophy
Jamie Benn: 2014–15

Conn Smythe Trophy
Joe Nieuwendyk: 1998–99

Frank J. Selke Trophy
Jere Lehtinen: 1997–98, 1998–99, 2002–03

Lester Patrick Trophy
Neal Broten: 1997–98

Roger Crozier Saving Grace Award
Ed Belfour: 1999–2000
Marty Turco: 2000–01, 2002–03

William M. Jennings Trophy
Ed Belfour and Roman Turek: 1998–99

First-round draft picks

Note: This list does not include selections of the Minnesota North Stars.

1993: Todd Harvey (9th overall)
1994: Jason Botterill (20th overall)
1995: Jarome Iginla (11th overall)
1996: Ric Jackman (5th overall)
1997: Brenden Morrow (25th overall)
1998: None
1999: None
2000: Steve Ott (25th overall)
2001: Jason Bacashihua (26th overall)
2002: Martin Vagner (26th overall)
2003: None
2004: Mark Fistric (28th overall)
2005: Matt Niskanen (28th overall)
2006: Ivan Vishnevskiy (27th overall)
2007: None
2008: None
2009: Scott Glennie (8th overall)
2010: Jack Campbell (11th overall)
2011: Jamie Oleksiak (14th overall)
2012: Radek Faksa (13th overall)
2013: Valeri Nichushkin (10th overall)
2013: Jason Dickinson (29th overall)
2014: Julius Honka (14th overall)
2015: Denis Guryanov (12th overall)
2016: Riley Tufte (25th overall)
2017: Miro Heiskanen (3rd overall) and Jake Oettinger (26th overall)
2018: Ty Dellandrea (13th overall)
2019: Thomas Harley (18th overall)
2020: Mavrik Bourque (30th overall)
2021: Wyatt Johnston (23rd overall)
2022: Lian Bichsel (18th overall)

Hall of Famers
The Dallas Stars presently acknowledge an affiliation with a number of inductees to the Hockey Hall of Fame. Hall of Fame inductees acknowledged by the Stars include 13 former players and three builders of the sport. The three individuals recognized as builders by the Hall of Fame includes former Stars executives, and head coaches. The tenure of five player inductees, and the three builders acknowledged by the Stars occurred when the franchise was based in Minnesota (1967–1993). Mike Modano is the only Hall of Fame inductee that played with the franchise before and after its relocation to Dallas.

In addition to players and builders, the Stars also acknowledge an affiliation Hockey Hall of Fame inductee Dave Strader. Providing play-by-play for the Stars, he was a recipient of the Hall of Fame's Foster Hewitt Memorial Award for his contributions in hockey broadcasting.

Retired numbers

Notes:
 The NHL retired Wayne Gretzky's No. 99 for all its member teams at the 2000 NHL All-Star Game.

Franchise scoring leaders

These are the top-ten point-scorers in franchise (Minnesota and Dallas) history. Figures are updated after each completed NHL regular season.
  – current Stars player
Note: Pos = Position; GP = Games played; G = Goals; A = Assists; Pts = Points; P/G = Points per game

Franchise individual records

Most goals in a season: Dino Ciccarelli; Brian Bellows, 55 (1981–82; 1989–90)
Most assists in a season: Neal Broten, 76 (1985–86)
Most points in a season: Bobby Smith, 114 (1981–82)
Most penalty minutes in a season: Basil McRae, 378 (1987–88)
Most points in a season, defenseman: Craig Hartsburg, 77 (1981–82)
Most points in a season, rookie: Neal Broten, 98 (1981–82)
Most goals in a season, rookie: Neal Broten, 38 (1981–82)*
Most wins in a season: Marty Turco, 41 (2005–06)
Most shutouts in a season: Marty Turco, 9 (2003–04)

See also
 List of Dallas Stars head coaches
 List of Dallas Stars players
 List of Minnesota North Stars/Dallas Stars general managers

Notes

References

External links

 

 
National Hockey League teams
1967 establishments in Minnesota
Central Division (NHL)
Ice hockey clubs established in 1967
Ice hockey teams in Texas
National Hockey League in the Sun Belt